Nikitkino is a rural locality (a village) in Kiprevskoye Rural Settlement, Kirzhachsky District, Vladimir Oblast, Russia. The population was 5 as of 2010. There are 5 streets.

Geography 
Nikitkino is located 24 km northeast of Kirzhach (the district's administrative centre) by road. Afanasovo is the nearest rural locality.

References 

Rural localities in Kirzhachsky District